Eric Louis Zinterhofer (born August 1971) is an American private equity financier, and a founding partner of Searchlight Capital Partners.

Early life
Eric Zinterhofer was born in August 1971. He is the son of Dr Louis J. M. Zinterhofer and Susan A. Zinterhofer of Rumson, New Jersey. He earned a bachelor's degree from the University of Pennsylvania.

Career
In 1998, he took a job under Leon Black at Apollo Global Management. In 2010, he co-founded Searchlight Capital with Oliver Haarmann and Erol Uzumeri.

Personal life
In June 1996, Zinterhofer married billionaire heiress Aerin Lauder, the daughter of Ronald Lauder in his home at Wainscott, Long Island, New York, with Rabbi Peter J. Rubinstein presiding. They have two sons.

They live in New York City and have homes in Easthampton, New York, and Aspen, Colorado.

References

Living people
1971 births
University of Pennsylvania alumni
American financiers
Lauder family
Apollo Global Management people